Patricio Toledo (born 14 July 1962) is a Chilean retired footballer who played as a goalkeeper during his career. He obtained 19 caps for the Chile national side, making his debut on 9 April 1991. His last game with the Chile national team was on 18 May 1994 against Argentina in Santiago.

References

1962 births
Living people
Chilean footballers
Chile international footballers
Club Deportivo Universidad Católica footballers
Coquimbo Unido footballers
Unión Española footballers
Deportes Temuco footballers
Santiago Wanderers footballers
Chilean Primera División players
Footballers at the 1984 Summer Olympics
Olympic footballers of Chile
1991 Copa América players
1993 Copa América players
Association football goalkeepers
Pan American Games medalists in football
Pan American Games silver medalists for Chile
Footballers at the 1987 Pan American Games
Medalists at the 1987 Pan American Games